Giovanni Ruffini (1807 in Genoa – 1881) was an Italian writer and patriot of the early 19th century. He is chiefly known for having written the draft of the libretto of the opera Don Pasquale for its composer Gaetano Donizetti.

Don Pasquale
Ruffini had been condemned to death as an enemy of the state and was living in exile in Paris in 1842 when it was suggested to him by Jules Janin (newly appointed director of Théâtre-Italien) that he might offer his services to Donizetti as a librettist
. 
Donizetti told him exactly what he required for his latest opera project, Don Pasquale, but not that he intended to re-use music already written for other purposes. Ruffini duly wrote the draft libretto from the original text dating back to 1810, but Donizetti changed so much of Ruffini's version that librettist became angry and refused to allow his name to be mentioned in the programme for the première at the Théâtre Italien in Paris 3 January 1843.

Although Ruffini refused acknowledgement of his work for the libretto, Donizetti paid him 500 francs, which was competitive for both the length and the genre at the time.  Ruffini also reportedly enjoyed working with Donizetti in the early stages of their collaboration, though he wrote to family and friends that the composer continually pressed him to work faster.

Ruffini wrote several novels which were published in English by Thomas Constable & Company in Edinburgh, including Lorenzo Benoni Or Passages in the Life of an Italian (1853), The Paragreens on a Visit to the Paris Universal Exhibition (1856) and Doctor Antonio: A Tale (1858). These novels sought to raise the sympathy of people in England and France for the struggles of the Italian people during the Risorgimento.

References
Notes

Sources
Allitt, John Stewart (1991), Donizetti: in the light of Romanticism and the teaching of Johann Simon Mayr, Shaftesbury: Element Books, Ltd (UK); Rockport, MA: Element, Inc.(USA)
Ashbrook, William (1982), Donizetti and His Operas, Cambridge University Press. 
Ashbrook, William  (1998), "Donizetti, Gaetano" in Stanley Sadie  (Ed.),  The New Grove Dictionary of Opera, Vol. One. London: Macmillan Publishers, Inc.   
Ashbrook, William and Sarah Hibberd (2001), in  Holden, Amanda (Ed.), The New Penguin Opera Guide, New York: Penguin Putnam. .  pp. 224 – 247.
Osborne, Charles, (1994),  The Bel Canto Operas of Rossini, Donizetti, and Bellini,  Portland, Oregon: Amadeus Press. 
Sadie, Stanley, (Ed.); John Tyrell (Exec. Ed.) (2004), The New Grove Dictionary of Music and Musicians.  2nd edition. London: Macmillan.    (hardcover).   (eBook).
 Weinstock, Herbert (1963), Donizetti and the World of Opera in Italy, Paris, and Vienna in the First Half of the Nineteenth Century, New York: Pantheon Books. 

1807 births
1881 deaths
Writers from Genoa
Italian male poets
Italian opera librettists
Italian male novelists
Italian male dramatists and playwrights
19th-century Italian poets
19th-century Italian novelists
19th-century Italian dramatists and playwrights
19th-century Italian male writers
Deputies of Legislature I of the Kingdom of Sardinia
Deputies of Legislature III of the Kingdom of Sardinia